Dan Andrei Aldea (9 March 1950 – 18 January 2020) was a Romanian multi-instrumentalist (guitars, violin, and keyboards, mainly) and vocalist, best known for his work with the band Sfinx, but also for his solo career.

Aldea was born in Bucharest, where he graduated from the Music Academy, and was known as one of the best electric guitar players from Romania. Aldea has lived in Germany since 1981, after defecting. Just before defecting, he had played for several months in a night club in Belgium with his band Sfinx.

Along with Dorin Liviu Zaharia, he composed the music for the movie Nunta de piatră ("The Stone Wedding"). He died in Fântâna Doamnei, aged 69.

References
 Caraman Fotea, Daniela și Nicolau, Cristian (1999). Dicționar rock, pop, folk, pp. 18–19, 437–439. Editura Humanitas, București. 
 Ionescu, Doru (2005). Timpul chitarelor electrice. Jurnal de călătorie în arhiva TVR, ediția 1, Editura Humanitas Educational, București. 
 Stratone, Nelu. Interview with Dan Aldea, published in „Art&Roll” (2002) 

Romanian rock guitarists
Musicians from Bucharest
Romanian multi-instrumentalists
Romanian film score composers
Romanian defectors
2020 deaths
1950 births
Romanian expatriates in West Germany